James Chalmers (2 February 1782 – 26 August 1853) was a Scottish inventor (buried on 1 September 1853) who it was claimed, by his son, was the inventor of the adhesive postage stamps.

History 
He trained as a weaver, before he moved to Dundee in 1809 on the recommendation of his brother. He established himself as a bookseller, printer and newspaper publisher on Castle Street. He is known to have been the publisher of "The Caledonian" as early as 1822. Later he served as a Burgh Councillor and became Convener of the Nine Incorporated Trades.

As such, he was described as a slayer of the "dragons which retard progress", battling repeatedly in the cause of Burgh Reform, and fighting for the repeal of taxes on newspapers and newspaper advertisements, and the removal of the excise duty on paper. 

His most burning enthusiasm, however, was postal reform, and from 1825 he campaigned the authorities to speed up the mail between Edinburgh and London by convincing them that this could be done without extra cost. After several years he managed to induce a time saving of nearly a day in each direction.

In December 1837, he sent a letter outlining his proposals to Robert Wallace, MP for Greenock. Furthermore, he submitted an essay for a proposal for an adhesive postage stamp and cancelling device which was dated 8 February 1838. This also contained illustrations of one penny and two-pence values. He did not favour the use of an envelope for a letter, as each additional sheet incurred an additional charge. Instead, he proposed that a "slip" or postage stamp could seal a letter.

His son, Patrick Chalmers (born Dundee, 26 July 1819 – died Wimbledon, Surrey, 3 October 1891), wrote many articles that attempted to evince his father's share in the work of postal reform and as inventor of the adhesive postage stamp. His book Robert Wallace MP and James Chalmers, the Scottish Postal Reformers was published in 1890. Patrick Chalmers daughter, Leah Chalmers, wrote a book How the adhesive postage stamp was born which was published in 1939. In 1971 a further book was published about James Chalmers James Chalmers Inventor of the adhesive postage stamp. The co-author William J Smith was a director of David Winter & Sons Ltd (successor to the James Chalmers printing company). Charles Chalmers had succeeded his father James in the printing business in 1853. Charles took David Winter into partnership in 1868 and left him the business on his death in 1872. The printing company was renamed to David Winter & Son. All these books claim that James Chalmers first produced an essay for a stamp in August 1834 but no evidence for this is provided in any of the books.

References and sources

Notes

Footnotes

Sources
Patrick Chalmers, Robert Wallace MP and James Chalmers, the Scottish Postal Reformers, published by Effingham Wilson & Co, 1890
Leah Chalmers, How the adhesive postage stamp was born, London, P S King & Son Ltd, 1939, 33pp
William J Smith & J E Metcalfe, James Chalmers Inventor of the adhesive postage stamp, David Winter & Son Ltd, 1971, 148pp
James Chalmers: Biography on Undiscovered Scotland
The claim for James Chalmers

External links

Gazetteer for Scotland
Testament of James Chalmers
The first essay for adhesive postage stamps submitted by James Chalmers to the General Post Office on 17 February 1838 

1782 births
1853 deaths
Scottish inventors
19th-century Scottish businesspeople
British publishers (people)
Scottish printers
People from Arbroath
Postal pioneers
People associated with Dundee